Aga Jari may refer to:
Aga Jari, East Azerbaijan
Aga Jari, Zanjan